Ametrea is a genus of moths of the family Crambidae. It contains only one species, Ametrea nebulalis, which is found on the Sula Islands.

References

Pyraustinae
Monotypic moth genera
Moths of Indonesia
Crambidae genera
Taxa named by Eugene G. Munroe